Central Presbyterian Church may refer to:

in Canada
 Central Presbyterian Church (Hamilton)

in the United States
 Central Presbyterian Church (Little Rock, Arkansas), listed on the NRHP in Arkansas
 Central Presbyterian Church (Denver, Colorado), listed on the NRHP in Denver, Colorado
 Central Presbyterian Church (Atlanta, Georgia), listed on the NRHP in Georgia
 Central Presbyterian Church (Anneslie, Towson, Maryland)
 Central Presbyterian Church (St. Paul, Minnesota), listed on the NRHP in Minnesota
 Central Presbyterian Church (Montclair, New Jersey), listed on the NRHP in New Jersey
 Central Presbyterian Church (New York City)
 Central Presbyterian Church (Chambersburg, Pennsylvania)
 Central Presbyterian Church (Amarillo, Texas), listed on the NRHP in Texas
 Central Presbyterian Church (Austin, Texas)
 Central Presbyterian Church (Waxahachie, Texas), listed on the NRHP in Texas
 Second Presbyterian Church (Columbus, Ohio), also known as Central Presbyterian Church